The Anatomy of a Moment (Spanish: Anatomía de un instante) is a 2009 non-fiction book by Javier Cercas, which won the National Prize for Narrative Writing.  An English translation by Anne McLean appeared in 2011. Initially, Cercas writes in the prologue, he had attempted to write a novel about the coup d'état of 23 February 1981. When this proved too awkward, he began to write a non-fiction narrative of the events  - events made memorable by the "television images of the braggart moustachioed Lieutenant Colonel Tejero." It is not straight history however, Cercas "enters people's minds and speculates on their motives."

The moment Cercas scrutinises in the book has been captured in TV footage.  It is when Tejero, having stormed into the Spanish parliament, orders the MPs to get down on the floor. His Civil Guards let off a burst of gun-fire.  In that moment, everyone dives for cover—except for three people.  The motives  of the three who remained in their seats—Prime Minister Adolfo Suárez, the leader of the Communist Party Santiago Carrillo, and the Deputy Prime Minister General Gutiérrez Mellado, who advanced on Tejero—are examined, as are the parts they played as Spain moved from dictatorship to democracy in the 1970s.  They are balanced in the narrative by the three figures of the coup—General Milans del Bosch, General Armada and Tejero.

The writer Michael Eaude: "Cercas hangs his enthralling story round the defiance of these three. (...) Suárez becomes the main character in Cercas's book (...) Cercas is a major novelist who has written a fascinating account of a key event in Spain's recent history."

Rubio-Pueyo argues that Anatomía de un instante may have to be considered as a textual materialisation of the so-called Cultura de la Transición ("Culture of the Transition", CT), or as a literary translation of the régimen del 78 ("Regime of '78").

References

 Chisholm, A (2011) The Telegraph review
 New Yorker review

2009 non-fiction books
Spanish non-fiction books
Arnoldo Mondadori Editore